The 2022 WAFF Futsal Championship was the fourth edition of the WAFF Futsal Championship. It was held in Kuwait City, Kuwait.

Teams
Eight teams entered the tournament. Jordan, Qatar, Syria, Yemen won't participate.

Referees 

 Husain Al Bahhar 
 Rawand Rashid Shwan 
 Eisa Abdulhoussain 
 Khalil Balhawan 
 Ahmed Al Ghais

Group stage

Group A

Group B

Knockout stage

Bracket

Semi-finals

Final

Goalscorers

Final ranking

References

External links
 Futsalplanet.com

2022
WAFF
International futsal competitions hosted by Kuwait
WAFF
WAFF